
Gmina Mirosławiec is an urban-rural gmina (administrative district) in Wałcz County, West Pomeranian Voivodeship, in north-western Poland.

Villages
Apart from the town of Mirosławiec, Gmina Mirosławiec contains the villages and settlements of Bronikowo, Drzewoszewo, Gniewosz, Hanki, Hanki-Kolonia, Jabłonkowo, Jabłonowo, Jadwiżyn, Kalinówka, Kierpnik, Kolonia Chojnice, Kolonia Polne, Kolonia Zacisze, Łowicz Wałecki, Mirosławiec Górny, Nieradź, Piecnik, Pilów, Próchnowo, Sadowo, Setnica and Toporzyk.

Neighbouring gminas
Gmina Mirosławiec is bordered by the gminas of Kalisz Pomorski, Tuczno, Wałcz and Wierzchowo.

References
Polish official population figures 2006

Miroslawiec
Wałcz County